Velešín is a town in Český Krumlov District the South Bohemian Region of the Czech Republic. It has about 3,800 inhabitants.

Administrative parts

Villages of Bor, Chodeč, Holkov and Skřidla are administrative parts of Velešín.

Geography
It lies in the Gratzen Foothills. It is situated on the shore of the Římov Reservoir, built on the Malše river.

History
The first written mention of Velešín is from 1266, when the local castle was documented. The castle and the settlement were probably founded in the 13th century. From 1387 until 1611, Velešín was a property of the Rosenberg family. During this era, the village was promoted to a market town. The originally separate estate was merged with the Nové Hrady estate, and the importance of the castle declined. In the 1480s, the castle was abandoned, and gradually fell into disrepair.

After death of Peter Vok of Rosenberg in 1611, Velešín was inherited by Jan Jiří of Schwamberg, but after the Bohemian Revolt, his properties were confiscated and Velešín was acquired by Count Charles Bonaventure de Longueval of Bucquoy. The Bucquoy owned Velešín until 1848.

Sights
North of the town there are remnants of the Budweis–Linz Horse-Drawn Railway, including one bridge. An educational trail leads around the remnants.

Notable people
Franciszek Krajowski (1861–1932), military officer

References

External links

 

Cities and towns in the Czech Republic
Populated places in Český Krumlov District